Paul Anthony Wiggins (born August 17, 1973) is a former American football offensive lineman in the National Football League (NFL) for the Pittsburgh Steelers, Denver Broncos and Washington Redskins.  He played college football at the University of Oregon and was drafted in the third round of the 1997 NFL Draft.

External links

1973 births
Living people
American football offensive tackles
Oregon Ducks football players
Pittsburgh Steelers players
Washington Redskins players
Amsterdam Admirals players
Players of American football from Portland, Oregon